The years from 2010 to 2014 saw an increase in conference realignment in the NCAA. With over 120 schools moving programs to new conferences, it resulted in significant changes in the American collegiate athletic landscape.

Several Division I all-sport conferences experienced significant changes as a result of these realignments.  The Big East Conference split into separate football-sponsoring and non-football conferences, while after seeing near-total replacement of their membership the Western Athletic Conference replaced football with men's soccer and dropped women's gymnastics.  The Great West likewise dropped football, and later disbanded after being left with unsustainable membership (1 school). Men's ice hockey was also significantly affected. The Big Ten Conference announced that it would begin sponsoring that sport in the 2013–14 season, which resulted in a chain of conference moves that led to the formation of the new National Collegiate Hockey Conference and the demise of the Central Collegiate Hockey Association. Three other single-sport conferences disbanded—the Atlantic Soccer Conference (men's), the National Lacrosse Conference (women's), and the Pacific Coast Softball Conference. Two lacrosse-only conferences, the ECAC Lacrosse League (men's) and American Lacrosse Conference (women's), disbanded after the 2013–14 school year (2014 lacrosse season), with all but two of their members announcing moves to other leagues for the 2015 lacrosse season (the Air Force men and Johns Hopkins women became independents; both teams would join conferences within two years).

Fewer changes took place in Division II and Division III. However, the period is still notable for the creation or demise of several conferences.

In Division II, the Great American Conference was created in 2011 by former members of the Gulf South and Lone Star Conferences, both of which remained in operation. Another league, the Great Midwest Athletic Conference (G-MAC), was founded the same year by an alliance of established D-II members and schools moving from the NAIA; it began play in 2012. In June of that year, the football-playing members of the West Virginia Intercollegiate Athletic Conference announced that they would break away to form a new conference. This led to the demise of the WVIAC and creation of the Mountain East Conference, plus a significant expansion of the G-MAC.

In Division III, seven members of the Southern Collegiate Athletic Conference broke from that league after the 2011–12 season, joining with an eighth school to form the Southern Athletic Association. Also, the single-sport New England Football Conference lost eight of its 16 members when the Massachusetts State Collegiate Athletic Conference announced it would add football in the 2013 season. Another single-sport conference, the 43-member North East Collegiate Volleyball Association in men's volleyball, disbanded after the 2010–11 school year, following the NCAA's announcement that it would sponsor an official Division III championship for that sport beginning in 2011–12. The creation of the Division III men's volleyball championship also led to the formation of two Division III conferences dedicated to that sport, the United Volleyball Conference in 2010 and the Continental Volleyball Conference in 2011. The CVC would split into two leagues along geographic lines in 2014, with the league's eastern members retaining the conference name and its midwestern members forming the Midwest Collegiate Volleyball League.

Three sports that have a single NCAA championship for all divisions—rifle, women's gymnastics, and women's water polo—saw the formation of new conferences in 2013. In rifle, six schools (five in Division I and one in Division II) created the Patriot Rifle Conference. Four former WAC women's gymnastics members joined with a fifth school to form an alliance initially known as the Mountain Rim Gymnastics Championship; the alliance ultimately gained full NCAA recognition as the Mountain Rim Gymnastics Conference in the 2014–15 school year. Finally, in women's water polo, seven California schools (four in Division I, one full Division II member, and two transitioning from the NAIA to Division II) formed the Golden Coast Conference.

Membership changes

Confirmed changes
The following schools announced changes in conferences during this period of 2010–2014.  The year given is the academic year in which the change occurred, which for spring sports differs from the year in which competition began.

Aborted changes
In addition to the above moves, several schools announced intended changes of conference, but then changed course without ever competing in the new conference, selecting a different conference instead or deciding not to move at all. While not actualized, some of these announced conference changes altered the dynamic of the broader realignment.

Rumored and possible changes
Below is a list of schools that reportedly considered changing conferences during the 2010–13 conference realignment.  Speculation more than a year old without further news, or superseded by subsequent events, is shaded.

References

External links

 List
Schools changing conference in the 2010